Józef Hieronim Retinger (Kraków, 17 April 1888  12 June 1960, London; World War II noms de guerre Salamandra, "Salamander", and Brzoza, "Birch Tree") was a Polish scholar, international political activist with access to some of the leading power brokers of the 20th century, a publicist and writer.

Already as a gifted student in Paris and London he mixed with the leading lights of music and literature. Most notably, he became a friend of compatriot Joseph Conrad. During World War I, the young Retinger became politically active in Austria-Hungary and Russia on behalf of the Polish independence movement. Following a failed attempt to broker peace between Austria-Hungary and the Allies of World War I, he had to retreat to Central America, where he became an economic adviser.

After the outbreak of World War II, he was principal adviser to the Polish government-in-exile. Early in 1944, a daring mission into Occupied Poland by parachute, with the help of British intelligence, added to his air of mystery and subsequent controversy. A Freemason with a reputation as a grey eminence, after World War II he went on to cofound the European Movement, which led to the establishment of the European Union, and was instrumental in forming the secretive Bilderberg Group. In 1958, he was nominated for the Nobel Peace Prize.

Early life

Józef Retinger was born in Kraków, Poland (then part of Austria-Hungary), the youngest of five children: his father had a daughter, Aniela, from a first marriage to Helena Jawornicka. His mother was Maria Krystyna Czyrniańska, daughter of a Greek Catholic Lemko professor of chemistry at the Jagiellonian University. His father, Józef Stanisław Retinger, was the personal legal counsel and successful adviser to French-born Count Władysław Zamoyski. Retinger's great-grandfather, Filip Rettinger, was a Jewish tailor from Tarnów who with his family converted to Catholicism in 1827. When his lawyer grandson died, Count Zamoyski took the promising youngster, Józef, into his household and paid for him to attend the Bartłomiej Nowodworski High School in Kraków. Retinger's eldest brother, Emil, became a commander in the Polish Navy, while his son, was stationed in the United Kingdom during World War II (1943–45), as a member then leader of Squadron 308 of the Polish Air Force. Retinger's brother, Juliusz, taught physiological chemistry at the University of Chicago and University of Wilno. Retinger himself initially considered a career in the priesthood, but three months in the Jesuit novitiate in Rome confirmed he would not be suited to the life.

Further financed by Count Zamoyski in 1906, Retinger entered simultaneously the Ecole des sciences politiques and the Sorbonne in Paris and two years later, aged twenty, became the youngest person ever to earn a Ph.D. in literature from there. While in the French capital, armed with introductions from Zamoyski and his own relative, the salonnière and pianist Misia Sert, he moved in intellectual circles and was befriended by among others, André Gide, François Mauriac, Jean Giraudoux, Erik Satie and Maurice Ravel. His early literary ambitions were stopped in their tracks when he presented his first novel, "Les Souffleurs" to André Gide for his opinion. Gide told him: Joseph, you will never be a writer.

He next went to Munich to study comparative psychology for a year. From there, encouraged by Zamoyski, in 1910 he moved to England, where he entered the London School of Economics for a year's study and began a lobbying operation on behalf of the Polish cause and its populations scattered across three ailing empires. Formally he became Director of the London Office of the Polish National Committee (1912–1914). During this time he continued to move in élite circles and  thanks to an introduction by Arnold Bennett whom he had met in Paris, Retinger developed a close friendship with his older Polish compatriot, the already well established novelist, Joseph Conrad. Retinger urged Conrad to visit Poland, and on 28 July 1914, the day World War I broke out, Retinger, his wife Otolia, and Conrad, his wife, and their two sons arrived in Kraków, the two men's childhood stamping grounds (they were alumni of the same secondary school). Due to the closeness of the Russian border (Russia was then allied to Great Britain), the Conrads soon sought greater safety in the Tatra Mountains resort of Zakopane. Retinger would write about Conrad in his 1943 book, Conrad and His Contemporaries. Historian Norman Davies suggests that it was probably Conrad who introduced the "polyglot and polymath" Retinger to the British intelligence services. Later Retinger became a personal friend of Major-General Sir Colin Gubbins, wartime head of SOE, and after the war an MI6 "asset".

World War I

With the clouds of war closing in, the project of writing a play together with Conrad based on the latter's novel, Nostromo had to be abandoned as both men hurriedly left Austria Hungary. Retinger would have been eligible for military call up in Galicia, but no mention of this is made by his biographers. Instead, he put aside literary endeavours and once more assumed the role of a political lobbyist for Poland, publishing pamphlets and travelling between London, Paris and New York, aided by Conrad in London. In the first years of the war, this was not on the agenda of the major powers. Retinger looked instead for other potential alliances and political leverage which led to meetings with leading Zionists of the time, including Chaim Weizmann, Vladimir Zhabotinski and Nahum Sokolow who were seeking international recognition and rights for the Jewish diaspora. In 1916 guided by Zamoyski and with the approval of H. H. Asquith, David Lloyd George and Georges Clemenceau with his old Parisian connections, Sixtus and Xavier de Bourbon Parme, the Duchess of Montebello and Marquis Boni de Castellane, as well as Zamoyski's friend the Polish General of the Jesuits, Włodzimierz Ledóchowski, Retinger became a "courier" in the secretive European dynastic negotiation suing for peace with Austria. It became known as the Sixtus Affair but was a failure, due to Germany's refusal to cooperate thus making Austria more dependent on it. In 1917 he met Arthur "Boy" Capel, the half-French dilettante, polo player and "sponsor" of Coco Chanel. Capel is said to have planted in Retinger's mind the idea of a world federal government based on an Anglo-French alliance. After concerns for his personal safety due to his "political meddling" in Austria-Hungary and in the emergent Soviet Union, in 1918 Retinger was banned from France, and sought sanctuary in Spain for several months.

Mexican years
 
He travelled on to Cuba and then to Mexico, where he became an unofficial political adviser to union organizer Luis Morones whom he fortuitously met crossing the Atlantic, and to President Plutarco Elías Calles. A glimpse of Retinger, newly divorced and love lorn for the American journalist, Jane Anderson, appears in the biography of another American woman, the communist sympathiser Katherine Anne Porter, a member of the Morones circle. In it he is described as a "Polish intriguer" and "British Marxist". In 1921 while on an obscure mission to the United States to buy saddles, Retinger was arrested and imprisoned in Laredo and Porter was despatched from Mexico to get him released. That same year Retinger had proposed that Katherine Porter and her friend Mary Doherty accompany him to Europe to do "collaborative work", an offer that was spurned. Retinger helped advance Mexico's nationalization of its oil industry in 1928. His activities in Mexico lasted a total of almost seven years and only ended with Calles's fall from power in 1936. They inspired Retinger to write three volumes on the tumultuous events of that Latin American republic. The Mexican years were punctuated by trips back to Europe where he took on the role of Representative in the United Kingdom of the Polish Socialist Party (1924–1928). In 1926 he married his second wife, Stella, with whom he travelled to Mexico on one occasion. After her death in 1933 his two daughters were left in the care of their maternal grandmother and were estranged from him until the 1950s.

In the rest of the interwar period, he published many contributions in periodicals, such as the Polish Wiadomości Literackie (Literary News) (see Wiadomości), on literary and political subjects.

Building blocks on the table

During World War II, Retinger who was in London, was involved in arranging for Polish troops to be transferred to Britain from France. He was bidden by Winston Churchill personally to escort Władysław Sikorski by plane to England from France, which had just capitulated to the invading Germans. He became principal adviser and confidant to the Prime Minister of the Polish Government in Exile now re-established in London. In fact, their political relationship went back to 1916 and was strengthened during Wladyslaw Sikorski's earlier brief stint as prime minister, 1922-23 in newly independent Poland, and came to greater fruition when both men were later in exile in London.

Sikorski's dependence on Retinger was the greater as he did not have mastery of English. At this time Retinger was despatched to talk with other exiled government representatives in London, who included Marcel-Henri Jaspar, Paul Van Zeeland, Paul-Henri Spaak in preparation for a post-war geopolitical landscape. He went on to posit a "Sikorski Plan" consisting of two stages, the first of which was signed in January 1942 and proposed a Polish-Czech confederation. The idea was to expand it into a Central European confederation with Poland and Lithuania, Czechoslovakia as its nucleus around which would be grouped Romania, Hungary, Yugoslavia and Greece. The agenda behind this was to create a common political blue-print for smaller countries abutting larger European powers and became the basis of a Belgian-Dutch union which would mirror the Polish-Czech arrangement.

This scheme of Retinger's caused problems between London and Moscow. In order not to tread on Soviet toes, the British altered their position and refused to back Sikorski's negotiations with the eight smaller European states. In his speech on the Council of Europe, Winston Churchill BBC radio broadcast on 21 March 1943 referred to the necessity of smaller nations forming groupings, but that it was too early to go into detail. The most Retinger was able to achieve was to push through the Sikorski-Mayski Agreement, signed on 30 July 1941, which provided for the formation of the Anders' army, thus ridding Stalin of the immediate human problem posed by the hundreds of thousands of Polish POWs and deportees from the Soviet occupied Kresy regions of the former Second Polish Republic, who after an arduous odyssey across thousands of miles would eventually end up as the United Kingdom's human problem. This trade-off adumbrated the Tehran and Yalta Conferences.

Brushes with death
Retinger narrowly avoided perishing in the sea off Gibraltar with Władysław Sikorski, in July 1943, but for the fact that he was not needed to accompany the premier on a troop inspection in the Middle East and would be better employed in London. The spare seat on the plane went to Sikorski's daughter who died with her father. Retinger was devastated by this turn of events. His relationship with Sikorski's successor, Stanislaw Mikolajczyk was much more ambivalent, but he obtained his consent for a special mission to Poland under SOE in April 1944.

With an SOE brief and without prior training, Retinger, aged 56, parachuted into occupied Poland with 2nd Lt. Tadeusz Chciuk-Celt, (see Operation Salamander), to meet with Polish underground figures, to deliver money to the Polish underground, and to "explain to his fellow Poles in the homeland 'how are we going to lose this war'".   Following at least one assassination attempt on him, Retinger expressed his frustration thus:

The latter quip was a reference to elements in the Polish Underground Army, the AK who were convinced Retinger was not serving the interests of his country and should therefore be "removed". One apparent attempt to liquidate him in Poland was on the grounds of a "death sentence" to be carried out on the alleged orders of general Kazimierz Sosnkowski. It was foiled by the intervention of an old friend and AK fighter, Tadeusz Gebethner. There was also an attempt during his visit in occupied Poland to poison him, which failed. On his return to London, he spent some time in the Dorchester Hotel in London's Park Lane recovering from his ordeal of the trip, which left him lame in one leg for the rest of his life, possibly due to the Polyneuritis brought on by the poison. His first visitor at the Dorchester was Sir Anthony Eden, the foreign secretary.

Immediately after the war, in 1945-6 Retinger travelled to Warsaw with emergency aid for the capital's population. It consisted largely of tons of British and US Army surplus, such as equipment, blankets and field-kitchens. When his erstwhile military escort from "operation Salamander", Tadeusz Chciuk and his new wife, Ewa, were arrested in Poland as subversives by the Polish Communist security service, Retinger allegedly appealed over their heads directly to Molotov in Moscow to have them released. Apparently the personal intervention succeeded. In 1948 the Chciuks became refugees in Germany.

Unwanted intrusion
Dark days followed World War II when tensions rose between former Western and Eastern allies and in April 1946 Retinger's flat in Bayswater, West London, was broken into and his and his secretary's files ransacked by persons unknown. He reported the matter to Scotland Yard, but the Metropolitan Police were not overly bothered. As a result, Retinger escalated his complaint and ended up being interviewed by the British security services. His view was that the newly Communist embassy of the Polish People's Republic was responsible for the break-in.

From the moment Winston Churchill had made his "Iron Curtain" speech in Fulton, Missouri, in April 1946, Retinger turned his efforts to a modified European project he had harboured for decades.

Vision for Europe

After World War II, Retinger feared another devastating war in Europe, this time fought between "Russia" and "the Anglo-Saxons". He became a leading advocate of European unification as a means of securing peace. He helped found both the European Movement and the Council of Europe, somewhat to the dismay of the philosopher Count Richard Coudenhove-Kalergi, the post-World War I anti-bolshevist founder of the Paneuropean Union movement.

Retinger, with his connections in Holland, Belgium, and Switzerland (he was a friend of Denis de Rougemont), took his cue from Winston Churchill's 1947 Zurich speech and found fertile ground with thirteen British Conservative members of Parliament who backed the idea of a loose European association of states. Retinger was the driving force in the creation of the European League for Economic Cooperation (initially called the Independent League of Economic Cooperation). He subsequently approached Duncan Sandys, Churchill's son-in-law and chairman of the United Europe Movement, about improving cooperation amongst the various organisations pursuing European unity. They agreed to organise a small meeting of their two organisation with the Nouvelle Equipes Internationales and the European Union of Federalists. This was held in Paris on 20 July 1947 when it was agreed to establish the Committee for the Coordination of the International Movements for European Unity. In December 1947 this was renamed the International Committee of the Movements for European Unity with Sandys as the Executive Chairman and Retinger as its Honorary Secretary. They organised the 1948 Hague Congress which brought together the two camps of those for a unified Europe and those in favour of a federal Europe.

During the congress, Retinger networked assiduously among the delegates, who included the Vatican diplomat, Giovanni Montini, the future Pope Paul VI. Ensuing discussions led eventually to the formation in 1951 of a European Coal and Steel Community.

Creator of Bilderberg
Retinger was the initiator and architect of the informal Bilderberg conferences in 1952-54 and was their permanent secretary until his premature death in London in 1960. The original group which met in the eponymous Dutch hotel in 1954 was gathered by  Retinger and included David Rockefeller, Denis Healey with Prince Bernhard of the Netherlands, as chairman. The purpose was to stimulate understanding between Europe and the US as the Cold War developed by bringing together financiers, industrialists, politicians and opinion formers. All discussions were to be strictly under Chatham House Rules. A founding member of the group, later British Labour Foreign Secretary, Healey, described the secretive Bilderberg meetings as the "brainchild" of Retinger.

Despite eschewing any distinctions or medals throughout his life, in 1958 he was nominated for the Nobel Peace Prize. He died in poverty of lung cancer. He was buried at North Sheen Cemetery in the presence of five British cabinet ministers as well as of his two younger daughters who were finally reconciled with him. According to the oration of Sir Edward Beddington-Behrens, Retinger not only had special access to 10 Downing Street but also to the White House.

Retinger's long time personal assistant and the editor of his posthumous memoirs, John Pomian, actually , was another Polish emigré in London, later a director of the Heim gallery in London's St James's, owned by the influential Polish art historian and philanthropist, Andrzej Ciechanowiecki.

Personal life
Retinger married twice. In 1912 he wed the well-born Otolia Zubrzycka (divorced 1921, died 1984), with whom he had a daughter, Malina (later Puchalska). In 1926 he wed Stella Morel (died 1933) – daughter of French-born pacifist and Dundee member of Parliament, E.D. Morel, and Mary, née Richardson – with whom he had two daughters, Maria (later Fforde) and Stasia (later French). Among his grandchildren are David French – translator into English of Andrzej Sapkowski's Witcher Saga – and fantasy novelist Jasper Fforde.

During the Great War and after, Retinger appears to have fallen under the spell of several women, especially the American journalist Jane Anderson, a supposed lover of Joseph Conrad. Retinger's own liaison with Anderson brought about the breakdown of Retinger's marriage to Otolia and drove a wedge between him and his friend Conrad. However Conrad biographer, John Stape, gives an alternative version for the cooling of relations between the two men, suggesting instead that as Retinger's enthusiasms were not shared by the novelist, shortly after the war, without his charming wife by his side, Retinger's proneness to exaggeration and tactlessness made him less socially acceptable.

Controversy
Over the decades since his 1960 death, the left-leaning Retinger continues to draw fascination and controversy with his political skill, his apparently selfless single-mindedness, and his lasting institutional legacy in Europe and beyond. Adam Pragier, a notable Polish exile and trenchant political commentator (and a secondary-school contemporary of Retinger's), has described him as "a sort of adventurer, but in the good sense of the word". On the other hand, detractors impugn his influence due to alleged connections, with deeply secret and malign factions, for which there is so far no reliable evidence. He remains an enigma, and probably the one substantial contributor to postwar European peace who has no physical monument.

In 2000 The Daily Telegraph'''s Ambrose Evans-Pritchard revealed, from declassified US Government records, that:
 This revelation touching on Cold War circumstances was subsequently analysed in greater detail in 2003 by Le Figaro commentator . However, as professor Hugh Wilford shows, the initiative to win American backing for a "United States of Europe" came neither from Allen Dulles, deputy chief, then chief of the CIA, nor from Senator William Fulbright, chairman of the American Committee on United Europe, but from European lobbyists of disparate motivation, namely Coudenhove-Kalergi and Retinger, the latter eclipsing the former due to Retinger's close connection with Winston Churchill on European matters. Retinger's plan was that the United States should be integral to political and economic support for a war-damaged Western Europe. As "head of casting" for his project, he set about finding key Americans to collaborate with him, among them Charles Douglas Jackson, Time-Life publisher in the 1940s and one-time head of propaganda at the Eisenhower White House.

Retinger has inspired disparate opinions. He was a figure whose allegiances, like his roots, remain obscure and whose accounts of himself varied according to his audience, thus undercutting his reliability – as reflected in various Joseph Conrad biographies and numerous other sources, including the considered, annotated review, by Norbert Wójtowicz of  Poland's Institute of National Remembrance, of Marek Celt's 2006 posthumously published Z Retingerem do Warszawy i z powrotem. Raport z podziemia 1944, [To Warsaw with Retinger and Back. A Report from the Underground 1944''] edited by Wojciech Frazik. The disparity in views on Retinger, despite the perception of some personality flaws, does not alter Retinger's mature postwar European legacy.

Selected works
By J. H. Retinger:
 
 
  available at University of Leeds Library
 
 
 
 
 
  
 
 
  
  
  

About Retinger:
 
 
 
 .

See also
List of governments in exile during World War II
European Movement
European Union
List of Poles

Notes

Further reading

External links 
Illustrated biography of Jozef Retinger assembled by Jan Chciuk-Celt
Polish Soviet Relations During The Second World War, photographs held by the Imperial War Museum with Józef Retinger (extreme left) at the signing of the Sikorski-Maiski agreement at the FO on 30.07.1941
Photograph of Retinger flanking Churchill at the Hague 1948, on Retinger's grandson's website
Chapter 4, European Unity, from Memoirs of An Eminence Grise ed. John Pomian
Bilderberg website on Retinger's life in brief

1888 births
1960 deaths
Ambassadors of Poland to Russia
Council of Europe people
Members of the Steering Committee of the Bilderberg Group
Polish politicians
University of Paris alumni
Alumni of the University of London
Polish Freemasons
European integration pioneers
Geopoliticians
Polish emigrants to the United Kingdom
Polish diplomats
Polish spies
Secret Intelligence Service personnel
Special Operations Executive personnel
20th-century Polish writers
Exophonic writers
Polish essayists
Male essayists
Polish political writers
Polish people of World War II
History of the European Union
Polish people of Jewish descent
Polish people of Rusyn descent
Burials at North Sheen Cemetery